Sts. Sergius and Herman of Valaam Church is a historic Russian Orthodox church in Nanwalek, Alaska.  It is named for the Saints Sergius and Herman of Valaam. Now it is under Diocese of Alaska of the Orthodox Church in America.

The settlement (first known as Alexandrovsk, and later as English Bay) was established during 1784-86 but its first church building was not built until about 1870. The current church building was built in about 1930 or before, and has been described as "a study in economical use of existing materials" and as having "no architectural distinction".  It consists of two small rectangular buildings joined together;  the nave section was possibly once a dance hall and the altar section was possibly once part of a local store.  It is argued nonetheless that the building "is an unusual example of adaptive use, and retains the integrity of its use over the past half century as the community R.O. church."

The building was added to the National Register of Historic Places in 1980.

See also
Sts. Sergius and Herman of Valaam Chapel, in Ouzinkie, Alaska, also NRHP-listed
National Register of Historic Places listings in Kenai Peninsula Borough, Alaska

References

Notes

Russian Orthodox church buildings in Alaska
Buildings and structures in Kenai Peninsula Borough, Alaska
Churches completed in 1930
Churches on the National Register of Historic Places in Alaska
Buildings and structures on the National Register of Historic Places in Kenai Peninsula Borough, Alaska